The 1897–98 Penn Quakers men's ice hockey season was the 2nd season of play for the program.

Season
With the West Park Ice Palace being built, the Quakers had a facility with stable ice to rely upon for the season. They were able to play an expanded schedule against mostly local teams and even compete in a local hockey league. The team ended up in a tie for second place with the since-closed Pennsylvania Dental College at a 3–2 record. Penn tied PDC twice during the season but as many leagues didn't count ties so those games were left off of the final standings. Because Wayne Country Club was part of the league it cannot be counted as a college conference.

Standings for the Philadelphia Hockey Clubs are included for reference.

The team did not have a head coach but Arthur Stackhouse served as team manager.

Roster

Standings

Schedule and Results

|-
!colspan=12 style=";" | Regular Season

† The Maryland Athletic Club refused to play in the 10-minute overtime session and were charged with a forfeit by the referee.

References

Penn Quakers men's ice hockey seasons
Penn
Penn
Penn
Penn